The Hull Yacht Club was founded in Hull, Massachusetts in 1880.  It merged with the Massachusetts Yacht Club in 1899, and with the Boston Yacht Club in 1903.  Their large clubhouse, which had been opened in 1891, was demolished in the 1930s.  A new club was formed in 1932, using the former clubhouse of the Old Beacon Club on Allerton Hill.  This was relocated to Fitzpatrick Way in 1939. The Yacht Club continues to host the Scorpion bowl regatta.

References

1880 establishments in Massachusetts
Hull, Massachusetts
Sailing in Massachusetts
Yacht clubs in the United States